Heikki Heikinpoika Lehmusto (30 August 1884 – 22 September 1958) was a Finnish sports leader and a sportswriter, who won bronze in the 1908 Summer Olympics.

Sport 

Wrestling was his main sport, but he won an Olympic medal in gymnastics.

He won the Finnish academic heavy weight wrestling championship in 1914 and 1915, which would be his best achievement in the sport as an athlete.

He was the chairman of the Finnish Wrestling Federation in 1932–1936 and 1938–1940, and its predecessor, the wrestling chapter of Finnish Gymnastics and Sports Federation in 1918–1920 and 1925–28.

He was a member of the board of the Finnish Olympic Committee in 1919–1920, 1927–1928 and 1934–1938, and the leader of the Finnish wrestling team at the 1920, 1928 and 1936 Summer Olympics.

He is an honorary chairman of the Finnish Wrestling Federation and an honorary member of the Finnish Gymnastics and Sports Federation and the club Helsingin Atleettiklubi.

He was also an accomplished sportswriter.

Biography 

His father was Heikki Lindholm (former Uusi-Lampila) and mother Kaisa Niesi. He finnicized his family name from Lindholm to Lehmusto in 1906. His first wife until 1928 was Elin Ingeborg Sjöblom, and second wife from 1929 Anna Solntsew-Sundström, the daughter of Sergei Solntsev. His only child Heikki was born in 1913.

He took his matriculation exam in the Porvoon suomalainen yhteiskoulu in 1906. He submitted his doctoral thesis in the University of Helsinki in 1923. His academic career peaked with an adjunct professorship in the University of Turku.

He was a passionate fennophile.

References 

1884 births
1958 deaths
Finnish male artistic gymnasts
Gymnasts at the 1908 Summer Olympics
Olympic gymnasts of Finland
Olympic bronze medalists for Finland
Olympic medalists in gymnastics
Medalists at the 1908 Summer Olympics